The Daini-Michinoku Toll Road (第二みちのく有料道路 Daini Michinoku Yūryōdōro) is a two-lane toll road in Aomori Prefecture that connects the towns Rokunohe and Oirase. The Daini-Michinoku Toll Road was designated in 1987 as part of a single expressway running from the capital city of Aomori Prefecture, Aomori to the prefecture's second largest city, Hachinohe. The road is managed by the Aomori Prefecture Road Public Corporation and is numbered E4A as an extension of the Tōhoku Expressway.

Tolls 

The toll gate for the Daini-Michinoku Toll Road does not correspond to ETC when traveling north from the Hachinohe Expressway and origins further south. In this case, the driver can pull the ETC card out of the on-board unit and present it to the toll operator, where the toll must be settled by a cash payment. When the gate is approached from the north the driver can pay with cash, coupons, or simply pass through the ETC gate. Otherwise, prices for use of just the Daini-Michinoku Toll Road are as follows:
Standard-sized car: ¥210 (¥110 for the disabled)
Large vehicles with 4 axles or less: ¥320
Large vehicles with 5 or more axles: ¥730
Kei car: ¥150 (¥80 for the disabled)
Light vehicles, etc.: ¥80

Route description 
From its southern terminus with Momoishi Road, the Daini-Michinoku Toll Road travels north from Shimoda-Momoishi Interchange in Oirase. The speed limit for the toll road is 60 km/h. The road quickly enters an agricultural area after its start. Three kilometers from Shimoda-Momoishi Interchange the road meets its toll booth. There are two gates servicing traffic in each direction. A parking area is available for drivers to access their ETC cards before proceeding through the gate. At the booth the road proceeds northwest. Approximately 3.6 kilometers from the booth the road meets Aomori Prefecture Route 10 at an interchange. Shortly after the interchange, the road gradually curves north. Along the gradual curve, the toll road continues on a ramp exiting to the left from the Kamikita Expressway. The Kamikita Expressway proceeds to continue northwest towards Aomori. The ramp carries the toll road on to its northern terminus at an at-grade junction with Aomori Prefecture Route 10 at the southern city limits of Misawa.

Future
The toll road is planned to be incorporated into a single expressway that extends north and west to connect with the Aomori Expressway and the northern terminus of the Tōhoku Expressway at the Aomori Interchange. This will be done by linking the Kamikita Expressway and Michinoku Toll Road to the Aomori Expressway. The thirty-year toll collection period for the use of the road is set to expire in March 2022.

Junction list
The entire toll road is in Aomori Prefecture.

See also

References

External links

Roads in Aomori Prefecture
Expressways in Japan
1992 establishments in Japan